Ans van Kemenade (born 1954 in Eindhoven) is a Dutch professor of English linguistics at the Radboud University Nijmegen specializing in the history of the English language.

Biography
Van Kemenade studied English and linguistics at Utrecht University, and received her doctorate there in 1987 with a thesis titled Syntactic Case and Morphological Case in the History of English. Following positions at Leiden University and the Vrije Universiteit Amsterdam she was appointed professor and chair of English linguistics at the Radboud University Nijmegen in 1999.

Van Kemenade has been the recipient of numerous awards and honours. In 2015 she was appointed as a member of the Permanent Committee for Large Scale Research Infrastructures advising the Dutch Research Council. In 2017 she was the recipient of a festschrift, Word Order Change in Acquisition and Language Contact, edited by Bettelou Los and Pieter de Haan. She was elected as a member of the Academia Europaea in 2018. In 2020 she was made a Knight of the Order of the Lion of the Netherlands.

Research
Van Kemenade works on language variation and change, particularly in the histories of English and Dutch. A major focus of her recent work has been the interplay of syntax and information structure in word order change.

Selected publications
 van Kemenade, Ans. 1987. Syntactic Case and Morphological Case in the History of English. Dordrecht: Foris. 
 Hulk, Aafke, and Ans van Kemenade. 1995. Verb second, pro-drop, functional projections and language change. In Adrian Battye & Ian Roberts (eds.), Clause structure and language change, 227-256. Oxford: Oxford University Press.
 van Kemenade, Ans, and Nigel Vincent (eds.). 1997. Parameters of Morphosyntactic Change. Cambridge: Cambridge University Press. 
 van Kemenade, Ans. 1997. V2 and embedded topicalisation in Old and Middle English. In van Kemenade & Vincent (eds.), 326-352.
 Fischer, Olga, Ans van Kemenade, Willem Koopman and Wim van der Wurff. 2000. The syntax of early English. Cambridge: Cambridge University Press. 
 van Kemenade, Ans. 2000. Jespersen’s Cycle revisited: formal properties of grammaticalization. In Susan Pintzuk, George Tsoulas & Anthony Warner (eds.), Diachronic syntax: models and mechanisms, 51-74. Oxford: Oxford University Press.
 van Kemenade, Ans, and Bettelou Los (eds.). 2006. The handbook of the history of English. Oxford: Wiley-Blackwell. 
 van Kemenade, Ans, and Bettelou Los. 2006. Discourse adverbs and clausal syntax on Old and Middle English. In van Kemenade & Los (eds.), 224-248.

References

External links 
 

Living people
Grammarians from the Netherlands
Corpus linguists
Syntacticians
Historical linguists of English
Academic staff of Radboud University Nijmegen
Utrecht University alumni
Knights of the Order of the Netherlands Lion
1954 births